The Courage of Kavik the Wolf Dog, also known as 'Kavik the Wolf Dog', is a 1980 made-for TV adventure film based on the novel Kävik the Wolf Dog.

Plot
Kavik, a champion sled dog, who has just won a race in Alaska, is sold for $4000 to George Hunter, a ruthless businessman from Seattle, who has local business interests. The plane carrying the dog crashes into the snow-covered wilderness; the pilot is killed and the dog is more dead than alive.

The crash site is found by Andy Evans, a young boy who lives in the nearby fishing settlement of Copper City. He struggles to get the dog home and begs his parents to let him ask the local doctor to take a look at Kavik. Dr Walker does, initially reluctantly, have a look and does his best to deal with Kavik's multiple injuries. The dog slowly recovers and starts to bond with Andy.  However, due to its near death experience Kavik is terrified of other dogs and is quick to run away when confronted. But Hunter arrives on a regular trip and claims back the dog, taking him to a kennel in his palatial Seattle home.

Hunter's kennel manager, seeing that the dog is unhappy and unlikely to be a champion racer, allows him to escape. Kavik manages to stow away on a coastal ferry and travels north. He struggles over inhospitable terrain, learning to fight other dogs and wolves for his food. Barely alive, he makes it back to Copper City, and reunites with Andy.

Hunter arrives, angrily demanding the return of the dog. Andy's father, Kurt, equally angrily claims that the dog will be happier with them than with Hunter. Hunter, who employs Evans and practically owns the whole town, gives in with ill grace, selling Kavik to the Evans family for a token sum.

Cast
 Ronny Cox	... Kurt Evans
 Linda Sorenson ... Laura Evans
 Andrew Ian McMillan ... Andy Evans
 John Ireland ... George Hunter
 Chris Wiggins ... Dr Vic Walker
 John Candy ... Pinky

Production
Much of this television film was shot in Alberta's Banff National Park. Additional filming locations were in Ontario, British Columbia and Alaska.

External links
 

1980 films
Films about dogs
Canadian adventure films
Canadian television films
English-language Canadian films
Films directed by Peter Carter
1980s Canadian films